The IBM Toronto Software Lab is the largest software development laboratory in Canada, and IBM's third largest software lab. Established in 1967 with 55 employees, the Toronto Lab (located in Markham) now has 2,500 employees developing some of IBM's middleware. Some of these include Db2, WebSphere Commerce, WebSphere Customer Center, Tivoli Provisioning Manager, IBM i compilers, and Rational Application Developer.

The software lab was relocated to Markham from a building at 1150 Eglinton Avenue East in Toronto (subsequently used by Celestica) on September 11, 2001.

See also 
 IBM Canada Head Office Building
 IBM Centers for Advanced Studies
 IBM CASCON
 IBM Rome Software Lab

References

IBM facilities
Buildings and structures in Markham, Ontario